Palashi Dam, is an earth-fill dam on Palashi river in Palashi village in Parner taluka of Ahmednagar district of state of Maharashtra in India.

Specifications 

Purpose
It was designed and built to provide irrigation for farms and drinking water for the nearest villages.

See also
 Dams in Maharashtra

References

Dams in Ahmednagar district
Dams completed in 1979
Earth-filled dams
1979 establishments in Maharashtra